The 2007–08 Croatian Football Cup was the seventeenth season of Croatia's football knockout competition. Dinamo Zagreb were the defending champion and they won it for a second year running after beating Hajduk Split 3–0 on aggregate.

Calendar

Preliminary round
The preliminary round was held on 29 August 2007.

First round
Matches played on 26 September 2007.

Second round
Matches played on 24 October 2007.

Quarter-finals
First legs were held on 7 November and second legs on 28 November 2007.

|}

Semi-finals

First legs

Second legs

Dinamo Zagreb won 6–3 on aggregate.

Hajduk Split won 5–1 on aggregate.

Final

First leg

Second leg

Dinamo Zagreb won 3–0 on aggregate.

See also
2007–08 Croatian First Football League
2007–08 Croatian Second Football League

External links
Official website 
Croatian Cup on Soccerway

Croatian Football Cup seasons
Croatia
Croatian Cup, 2007-08